Mangora can refer to:
 Mingora in Swat, Pakistan
 Mangora (spider), a genus of spiders